The 2021–22 Irish Super League season was the 48th running of Basketball Ireland's premier men's basketball competition, following the cancellation of the 2020–21 season due to the COVID-19 pandemic. The season featured 12 teams from across the Republic of Ireland and Northern Ireland. Tralee Warriors were crowned National Cup and League champions.

Teams

Results

Regular season standings

North Conference

*Belfast Star, with a 10–5 record, withdrew from the league before their final match of the regular season, due to a player registration error.

South Conference

Playoffs

Bracket

Quarter-finals

Semi-finals

Final

National Cup

Round 1

Quarter-finals

Semi-finals

Final

Source: Basketball Ireland

Awards

Player of the Month

Coach of the Month

Statistics leaders
Stats as of the end of the season

Regular season
 Player of the Year: Aaron Calixte (Tralee Warriors)
 Young Player of the Year: Cian Heaphy (Neptune)
 Coach of the Year: John Dowling (Tralee Warriors)
 All-Star First Team:
 Aaron Calixte (Tralee Warriors)
 Andre Nation (Ballincollig)
 Kason Harrell (Killester)
 Nil Sabata (Neptune)
 Roy Downey (Neptune)
 All-Star Second Team:
 Daniel Jokubaitis (Tralee Warriors)
 De'Ondre Jackson (Maree)
 Jonathan Jean (UCD Marian)
 Nikola Roso (Tralee Warriors)
 Stefan Zečević (Éanna)
 All-Star Third Team:
 Adrian O'Sullivan (Ballincollig)
 Cian Heaphy (Neptune)
 Eoin Quigley (Tralee Warriors)
 Lorcan Murphy (Templeogue)
 Milorad Sedlarevic (Ballincollig)

Notes

References

External links
Season fixtures
"Opening weekend of MissQuote.ie and InsureMyVan.ie National Leagues" at ireland.basketball
National Cup Round 1
National Cup quarter-finals
Season stats

Irish
Super League (Ireland) seasons
Basket
Basket